The National Archives of Botswana are the national archives of Botswana. They hold 20,000 items and are located in Gaborone.

Profile 
The Botswana National archives was established in 1967 as portfolio responsibility of the Ministry of Home Affairs. From that time the Archives operated on Administrative instructions issued by the Ministry until 1978 when Parliament enacted the Archives legislation which formally established the national archives of Botswana for the preservation of public Archives. The 1985 organisation and methods review of the Ministry of Labour and Home Affairs led to a revolutionary development in Botswana’s Records Management establishment. The Permanent Secretary to the President Circular No.4 of 1993 established BNARS as a department and gave it the mandate to provide a Records Management service to Government. It is located in the Parliament buildings in the City Center of Gaborone.

Functions of the Department
The main function of the Department is to provide records and information management service to government agencies; and to collect, preserve and access the nation’s documentary heritage. The National Archives Act provides that records which are 20 years and above be open for public access.

Gallery 
Below is a gallery of photos.

See also 
 National Library Service of Botswana
 List of national archives

References

External links 

 Botswana National Archives and Records Services opens private archives
 Official Facebook

Botswana culture
History of Botswana
Botswana
Libraries in Botswana
Museums in Botswana
Libraries established in 1967
1967 establishments in Botswana